La Fiera (English title: The Wild one) is a Mexican telenovela produced by Valentín Pimstein for Televisa in 1983.

Victoria Ruffo and Guillermo Capetillo star as the protagonists, while Rocío Banquells, Carlos Cámara, Nuria Bages and Raymundo Capetillo star as the antagonists.

Plot 
Natalie (Victoria Ruffo), a poor but beautiful girl of the neighborhood, arrives to conquer the heart of Víctor Alfonso (Guillermo Capetillo), a rich young man and of good family who has been his friend since childhood. However, both have to face opposition from the society, the parents of Victor Alfonso, who despise Natalie for being poor and have always wanted to his son marry Brenda (Rocío Banquells), a beautiful and sophisticated girl.

Cast 

 Victoria Ruffo as Natalie Ramírez "La Fiera"
 Guillermo Capetillo as Victor Alfonso Martínez Bustamante
 Rocío Banquells as Brenda del Villar
 Angélica Aragón as La Costeña
 Isabela Corona as Elodia
 Lupita Lara as Elena Martínez Bustamante (#1)
 Nuria Bages as Elena Martínez Bustamante (#2) Carlos Cámara as Lorenzo Martínez Bustamante
 Leonardo Daniel as Miguel Martínez Bustamante
 Luis Daniel Rivera as Manuel Pérez Brito "Papillón"
 Julieta Bracho as Regina
 Juan Antonio Edwards as El Chamuco
 Javier Marc as El Griego
 Beatriz Moreno as Lina
 América Gabriel as Tamara
 Óscar Bonfiglio  as Frankie
 Juan Verduzco as Marín
 Alfredo Alegría as Lupito #1
 Alfonso Iturralde as Lupito #2
 Enrique Gilabert as Lic. Meléndez
 Edith González as Julie
 Gabriela Ruffo as Carmela
 Carlos Rotzinger as Joaquín
 Fernando Larrañaga as Don Herrera
 Roxana Saucedo as Lulú
 Servando Manzetti as Pedro
 Aurora Clavel as Sor Trinidad
 Ernesto Laguardia as Raúl
 Nadia Haro Oliva as Elisa
 Miguel Ángel Ferriz as Rolando Miranda
 Raymundo Capetillo as Marcial Urquiza
 Maricruz Nájera as Angelina
 Lucianne Silva as Ramona
 Fernando Borges as Edmundo Gascón
 Eduardo Kastell as Receptionist
 Claudia Ramírez as Saleswoman
 Julieta Rosen as Nurse
 Christopher Lago as Alfonsito
 Óscar Sánchez as Mayordomo

Awards

References

External links 

1983 telenovelas
Mexican telenovelas
1983 Mexican television series debuts
1984 Mexican television series endings
Spanish-language telenovelas
Television shows set in Mexico
Televisa telenovelas